

Predicted and scheduled events
 May – The 2027 Eurovision song contest is scheduled; the location is typically determined by the previous year's winner.

Date unknown
 The autonomous region Bougainville in Papua New Guinea will gain independence per an agreement made in 2021.

References